Danny Moulis (born 25 July 1960) is an Australian former soccer player who played as a defender.

Club career
Moulis played for Canberra City and Sydney Olympic in the National Soccer League.

International career
In 1980, Moulis played three international matches for the Australia national team, with his first cap coming against Papua New Guinea.

After soccer
After his retirement from playing, Moulis became a lawyer.

References

1960 births
Living people
Australian soccer players
Association football defenders
Australia international soccer players
Canberra City FC players
Sydney Olympic FC players
1980 Oceania Cup players